Chittagong Zoo is a Zoo in Chittagong, Bangladesh. With an area of 6 acres of land it is located about three kilometers north-west of the city, alongside at the entrance of Foy's Lake, opposite the foothills of the mountains of USTC Medical College.

History
In 1988, MA Mannan, former Deputy Commissioner of Chittagong District and some other elites of the city, initially took initiative to establish a private zoo at Foy's Lake for the purpose of recreation, education and research on zoo animals. It is situated at hilly land of Foy's lake, South-Khulshi, Chittagong. Later, on February 8, 1989 the zoo was opened for the visitors. Initially 4.90 acres of land was allocated by the Bangladesh Government, which afterwards increased to 6 acres.

Attractions

Initially there were 5 different species and total number of animals were 23. After that the total number of species and animals has increased.

In 2019, the total number of animals ist 300 and the number of species is 53. Among them, 25 are Mammals, 24 are Birds and 4 are Reptiles.

Mammals
There are 25 available mammals in this zoo. They are:
 Bengal tiger
 Asiatic lion
 Asian black bear
 Chital
 Sambar deer
 Barking Deer
 Rhesus macaque
 Hoolock gibbon
 Capped langur
 Large Indian civet
 Bengal fox
 Jungle cat
 Leopard cat
 Slow loris
 Northern pig-tailed macaque
 Rottweiler
 German Shepherd
 German Spitz
 Indian gray mongoose
 Indian crested porcupine
 Plains zebra
 Gayal
 Asian palm civet
 Horse

Reptiles
There are 4 species of reptiles available here.
 Indian rock python
 Marsh crocodile
 Elongated tortoise
 Black softshell turtle

Birds
There are 25 species of Birds available in the zoo.
 Great hornbill
 Pigeon
 Turkey
 Guineafowl
 Peacock
 Common ostrich
 Oriental pied hornbill
 Griffon vulture
 Lesser adjutant
 Black kite
 Pallas's fish eagle
 Brahminy kite
 Little egret
 Cattle egret
 Black-crowned Night Heron
 Pond heron
 Little cormorant
 Alexandrine parakeet
 Rose-ringed parakeet
 Red-breasted parakeet
 Oriental turtle-dove
 Common Myna
 Jungle bush quail
 Red Junglefowl

Gallery

See also
 List of zoos in Bangladesh

References

External links

1989 establishments in Bangladesh
Zoos established in 1989
Zoos in Bangladesh
Buildings and structures in Chittagong
Tourist attractions in Chittagong